The Russia national korfball team is managed by the Russian Korfball Federation (RKF), representing Russia in korfball international competitions.

In response to the 2022 Russian invasion of Ukraine, on March 1, 2022, the International Korfball Federation announced that the Russian Korfball Federation would not be invited until further notice to any international korfball competition. This implied effectively that no Russian athletes shall take part in any international korfball event. Furthermore, the Russian Korfball Federation shall not be eligible to bid for the hosting of any IKF event until further notice, and no IKF events were planned in Russia.



Tournament history

References

External links
 Russian Korfball Federation (RKF)

National korfball teams
Korfball
National team